Lucifer Rising is a book written by author and Church of Satan priest Gavin Baddeley. The book covers both the recent and ancient history of Satanism, and provides an examination of modern Satanist culture. The book is published by Plexus Publishing (1999).

Organized into three parts—"The History of Satanism," "Satanism in 20th-Century Culture," and The Satanic Millenium "—much of the book is composed of interviews with a wide variety of personages associated with either the Satanic religion or its concomitant aesthetic, including Anton Szandor LaVey, Kenneth Anger, and Kerry Bolton.

Other individuals discussed in Lucifer Rising include Aleister Crowley, Michael Aquino, and Charles Manson.

Synopsis 
The book is divided into three parts, the first of which covers Satanism's history from the beginnings of the Black Mass to the aristocratic members of the Hellfire Club.

The second half looks at Satanism in the twentieth century, including Aleister Crowley, the Church of Satan, the Manson Family, and the growth of occult-inspired bands such as Black Sabbath and Led Zeppelin.

The final section of the book examines the new waves of Thrash Metal, Death Metal, and Scandinavian Black Metal, the Burzum's Varg Vikernes Euronymous' murder, the neo-Nazi element and the religious right's courts quest of heavy metal.

The book is richly decorated throughout with graphics, mediaeval ornaments, and exquisite images, and it also includes a comment from Anton LaVey, author of The Satanic Bible.

References

Satanism